The Milwaukee Brewers farm system consists of eight Minor League Baseball affiliates across the United States and in the Dominican Republic. Five teams are owned by the major league club, while three—the Nashville Sounds, Biloxi Shuckers, and Wisconsin Timber Rattlers—are independently owned.

The Brewers have been affiliated with the High-A Wisconsin Timber Rattlers of the Midwest League since 2009, making it the longest-running active affiliation in the organization among teams not owned by the Brewers. The longest affiliation in franchise history was with the Helena Gold Sox/Brewers, who were the team's Rookie affiliate in the Pioneer League for 32 seasons from 1985 to 2018; they were not partnered with Milwaukee in 2001 and 2002. The longest continuous affiliation in team history was the 23-year relationship with the Class A Beloit Brewers/Snappers of the Midwest League from 1982 to 2004. Their newest affiliate is the Nashville Sounds of the International League, which became the Brewers' Triple-A club in 2021; they were previously affiliated with Nashville from 2005 to 2014.

Current affiliates 

The Milwaukee Brewers farm system consists of eight minor league affiliates.

Past affiliates

Key

1968–1989
Prior to the 1963 season, Major League Baseball (MLB) initiated a reorganization of Minor League Baseball that resulted in a reduction from six classes to four (Triple-A, Double-A, Class A, and Rookie) in response to the general decline of the minors throughout the 1950s and early-1960s when leagues and teams folded due to shrinking attendance caused by baseball fans' preference for staying at home to watch MLB games on television. The only change made within the next 27 years was Class A being subdivided for the first time to form Class A Short Season in 1966.

1990–2020
Minor League Baseball operated with six classes from 1990 to 2020. In 1990, the Class A level was subdivided for a second time with the creation of Class A-Advanced. The Rookie level consisted of domestic and foreign circuits.

2021–present
The current structure of Minor League Baseball is the result of an overall contraction of the system beginning with the 2021 season. Class A was reduced to two levels: High-A and Low-A. Low-A was reclassified as Single-A in 2022.

Notes
General

League champions

References

External links 
 Baseball-Reference: Milwaukee Brewers Minor League Affiliates

 
Minor league affiliates